Candelabrum tentaculatum, also called the dreadlocks hydroid or calamari hydroid, is a sessile marine hydroid, that is found off the Cape Peninsula of South Africa.

Description
Naked cylindrical hydranth up to about 70mm long, covered by densely packed short capitate tentacles. Basal part carries a single whorl of about 17 long unbranched blastostyles, with gonophores near the hydranth.

Species range
Endemic to South Africa, known only from the Cape Peninsula and Port Elizabeth in 10 to 30 m of water.

Identification
Pale off-white slightly tapering cylindrical central part with rounded tip, covered with very short rounded tentacles. The base has a ring of long floppy reddish tentacles that drape over the substrate.

Natural history
Often found on pore-plated false corals Laminopora jellyae.

References

External links

Candelabridae
Animals described in 1966